Group B of the 1978 FIFA World Cup was one of two groups of nations competing for the de facto semi-finals of the 1978 FIFA World Cup. The group's first round of matches began on 14 June and its last matches were played on 21 June. All six group matches were played either at the Estadio Ciudad de Mendoza in Mendoza, or the Estadio Gigante de Arroyito in Rosario. The group consisted of Argentina, Brazil, Peru and Poland. Argentina advanced to the final match, and Brazil advanced to the third place match.

Qualified teams
The winners of Group 2 and 4 and the runners-up of Group 1 and 3 qualified for Group B of the second round.

Standings

Matches

Brazil vs Peru

Argentina vs Poland

Peru vs Poland

Argentina vs Brazil

Brazil vs Poland

Argentina vs Peru

References

1978 FIFA World Cup
Argentina at the 1978 FIFA World Cup
Brazil at the 1978 FIFA World Cup
Peru at the 1978 FIFA World Cup
Poland at the 1978 FIFA World Cup